Eduard Kägu (14 June 1900 Võtikvere Parish (now Mustvee Parish), Kreis Dorpat – 1 December 1924 Tallinn) was an Estonian politician. He was a member of the I Riigikogu, representing the Central Committee of Tallinn Trade Unions. He was a member of the Riigikogu since 20 October 1921. He replaced Johannes-August Allikso. On 6 December 1922, he resigned his position and he was replaced by Aleksander Leopold Raudkepp.

He died in during 1924 Estonian coup d'état attempt.

References

1900 births
1924 deaths
People from Mustvee Parish
People from Kreis Dorpat
Central Committee of Tallinn Trade Unions politicians
Members of the Riigikogu, 1920–1923
Deaths by firearm in Estonia